The Reindorf Review was a 2021 article published by the University of Essex and authored by barrister Akua Reindorf surrounding concerns of a suppression of academic freedom due to the de-platforming and blacklisting of academics Jo Phoenix and Rosa Freedman who had expressed "gender critical" views.

The university issued a public apology to both academics and was subject to review their internal policy regarding inviting speakers in the future.

Background 
On 5 December 2019, Jo Phoenix was invited to the University of Essex to hold a public seminar entitled “Trans rights, imprisonment and the criminal justice system” in which she was scheduled to discuss the possible tensions that would follow from the integration of transgender individuals into single sex prison systems. Backlash followed as credible threats of violence from students and staff accused Phoenix of transphobia. A flyer of a person brandishing a weapon displayed the text "Shut the fuck up, TERF." was posted round the university campus. The initial cancellation of the event was seen to be justified due to security concerns due to the threats of violence. However, following the cancellation, the sociology department blacklisted Phoenix from future talks on concerns of transphobia. This was deemed to be an illegal exercise as it limited Phoenix's freedom of expression. Since the University of Essex is a public authority it has an duty to uphold the right to free expression and thus the blacklisting was not considered to be held on credible grounds. The Reindorf Report states that "The later decision to exclude and blacklist Prof Phoenix was also unlawful. There was no reasonable basis for thinking that Prof Phoenix would engage in harassment or any kind of unlawful speech. The decision was unnecessary and disproportionate. Moreover the violent flyer was wholly unacceptable and should have been the subject of a timely disciplinary investigation."

On 30 January 2020, a roundtable discussion entitled "The State of Antisemitism Today” Rosa Freedman was subject to disinvitation due to 'spurious' and 'non-evidenced' allegations of transphobia. The allegation followed due to concerns over a 2018 open letter by Freedman and 54 other academics on the culture of fear surrounding the conducting of research into transgender issues. This was during a time where changes where being proposed to the Gender Recognition Act which were the topic of debate as it was considered to be a possible conflict towards academic freedom and scientific integrity. Research into transgenderism has been considered to be important as the subject of "no-debate" limits perspectives necessary to provide support to transgender adolescents. The current lack of empirical evidence with which to draw effective support from is said to be dangerous to transgender people and women (who are more often the subject of a disproportionate number allegations of transphobia) as well as emboldening transphobic right-wing ideology as counterarguments are unable to be explored due to pressures to self-censor research proposals. Professor Freedman attended the event on the 30th of January following an internal investigation by the University of Essex who concluded that there were insufficient grounds to bar Freedman from attending the event.

Aftermath 
Debates on academic freedom have continued with the Reindorf Report being an example of how university institutions prevent research into politically sensitive issues and how this impacts science as a whole. The Higher Education (Freedom of Speech) Bill 2021 and the Higher Education Authority (HEA) Bill 2022 are of particular contemporary interest, cited by supporters as a vital step to ensuring the credible enforcement of free speech on university campuses, while others claim it represents government overreach.

Stonewall, a charity developed following the Stonewall riots of 1969 have begun to be questioned by academics and scholars due to their potentially undemocratic and self-defeating influence in universities due to their continued lobbying efforts which have direct impacts on internal policy within universities. Stonewall has been critiqued for its effective use of 'policy capture' which sees it having disproportionate influence on the legal categories of sex and gender without proper democratic scrutiny

The Free Speech Union has pledged to commit to legal disputes with universities who do not uphold their duties towards freedom of speech.

See also 

 Academic freedom
 Transgenderism
 Feminist views on transgender topics
 Equality Act 2010
 Education Reform Act 1988
 Education (No. 2) Act 1986
 Universal Declaration of Human Rights
 Politicization of science
 Freedom of speech
 Freedom of education
 Stonewall
 Free Speech Union

References 

Freedom of expression in the United Kingdom
Freedom of speech in the United Kingdom
Transgender in the United Kingdom
Academic freedom
University of Essex
2021 documents